Zintle Nomtha Mali (born 21 January 1994) is a South African cricketer. In April 2018, she was named in the South Africa Women's squad for their series against Bangladesh Women. She made her Women's One Day International cricket (WODI) debut for South Africa against Bangladesh Women on 9 May 2018. She made her WT20I debut for South Africa against Bangladesh Women on 20 May 2018.

In October 2018, she was named in South Africa's squad for the 2018 ICC Women's World Twenty20 tournament in the West Indies. In February 2019, Cricket South Africa named her as one of the players in the Powerade Women's National Academy intake for 2019. In September 2019, she was named in the M van der Merwe XI squad for the inaugural edition of the Women's T20 Super League in South Africa. On 23 July 2020, Mali was named in South Africa's 24-woman squad to begin training in Pretoria, ahead of their tour to England.

References

External links
 
 

1994 births
Living people
People from Amathole District Municipality
South African women cricketers
South Africa women One Day International cricketers
South Africa women Twenty20 International cricketers
Border women cricketers
North West women cricketers